Afrivoluta is a genus of large deepwater sea snails with glossy shells, marine gastropod molluscs in the family Marginellonidae.

Species
Species within the genus Afrivoluta include:
Afrivoluta pringlei Tomlin, 1947

References

 Nomenclator Zoologicus info

Further reading 
 Lipe, R. 1991. Marginellas:37;pl.18, fig 1
 Lorenz 1993. World Shells 4:49

Marginellonidae